The Ida Hicks House was a historic house at 410 West Arch Street in Searcy, Arkansas.  It was a two-story wood-frame structure with Craftman styling, built in 1913 to a design by the noted Arkansas architect Charles L. Thompson.  It had a basically rectangular plan, but this was obscured by a variety of projections and porches.  A single-story porch extended across the south-facing front, supported by brick piers, and with exposed rafters under the roof.  The second floor had three groups of windows: the outer ones were three-part sash windows, while in the center there were two casement windows.

The house was listed on the National Register of Historic Places in 1991.  It has been listed as destroyed in the Arkansas Historic Preservation Program database, and was delisted in 2018.

See also
National Register of Historic Places listings in White County, Arkansas

References

Houses on the National Register of Historic Places in Arkansas
Houses completed in 1913
Houses in Searcy, Arkansas
National Register of Historic Places in Searcy, Arkansas
Former National Register of Historic Places in Arkansas
Demolished buildings and structures in Arkansas
1913 establishments in Arkansas